David Baird Sr. (April 7, 1839February 25, 1927) was an Irish-born American politician who served as a United States Senator from New Jersey.

Biography
A Scots-Irishman born in County Londonderry, Ireland, Baird immigrated to the United States in 1856 and entered the lumber business in Port Deposit, Maryland. He moved in 1860 to Camden, New Jersey, where he continued in the lumber business and also engaged in banking. He was a member of the Board of Chosen Freeholders of Camden County from 1876 to 1880. He also served as the sheriff of Camden County, New Jersey, from 1887 to 1889, and again from 1895 to 1897. He was a member of the State board of assessors in 1895 and from 1901 to 1909.

Baird was an unsuccessful candidate for election to the United States Senate in 1910, but he was appointed on February 23, 1918, to the Senate to fill the vacancy caused by the death of William Hughes. He was subsequently elected as a Republican on November 5, 1918, and until March 3, 1919, when he did not run for reelection. He resumed his former business pursuits in Camden, where he died and was interred in Harleigh Cemetery.

Baird was the father of David Baird Jr., also a Senator from New Jersey.

See also

Federal government of the United States
List of United States senators born outside the United States
Politics of the United States

Notes

External links

David Baird at The Political Graveyard

1839 births
1927 deaths
American bankers
Burials at Harleigh Cemetery, Camden
County commissioners in New Jersey
Irish emigrants to the United States (before 1923)
New Jersey Republicans
Politicians from Camden, New Jersey
People from County Londonderry
Republican Party United States senators from New Jersey